The A1000 is a main road in the United Kingdom, going from London to Welwyn.

History 
The A1000 was formerly known as the Great North Road (and parts of it still bear this name), or A1, but after a bypass was built in the 1920s it became the A1000. The 1922 Road Lists describes the A1000 as Finsbury Park Station to Muswell Hill, which made it a quite short road. This road was later reclassified as part of the A1201.

Route 
On its route it passes through Chipping Barnet, Potters Bar, and Hatfield, and goes through the Traditional Counties of Hertfordshire and Middlesex.

Major junctions

References

Location

 for the start of the road near Highgate Wood
Local History and Heritage of Barnet

Roads in England
Roads in Hertfordshire
Roads in London
Welwyn Garden City
Potters Bar
Hatfield, Hertfordshire
Transport in the London Borough of Barnet